Péter Szikla (born 29 April 1923, date of death unknown) was a Hungarian alpine skier. He competed in three events at the 1948 Winter Olympics.

References

1923 births
Year of death missing
Hungarian male alpine skiers
Olympic alpine skiers of Hungary
Alpine skiers at the 1948 Winter Olympics
Place of birth missing
20th-century Hungarian people